John Gunn (born 26 February 1925) is an Australian writer, sailor and aviator.

Education
Gunn attended Newington College aged 12 in 1937. He entered the Royal Australian Naval College as a cadet-midshipman in 1939. In 1946 he began training as a Fleet Air Arm pilot, serving in England and the Mediterranean. He returned to Australia in 1949 and attended Sydney University, aborting the study of medicine to start a family.

Career
Gunn and his young family moved to England, where he began his writing career. In 1957 they returned to Australia. He attained various positions including:
Literary guide and friend to the Australian Broadcasting Commission's children's programme.
Aviation correspondent for the Australian Financial Review

Bibliography

Novels

 The Wild Abyss (1972)
 Water Hazard (1995)

Novels for children

 Barrier Reef Espionage (1955)
 Battle in the Ice (1956)
 Gibraltar Sabotage (1957)
 Sea Menace (1958)
 Submarine Island (1958)
 The Humpy in the Hills (1960)
 Peter Kent's Command (1960)
 Dangerous Enemies (1961)
 City in Danger (1962)
 Conquest of Space (1962)
 The Goodbye Island (1963)

Edited

 Dangerous Secret (1960)
 The Gold Smugglers (1962)
 The Gravity Stealers (1965)

Drama

 Wren's Nest (1955)
 Hildegard : A Play (1999)

Non-fiction

 Barrier Reef by Trimaran (1966)
 Seaspay : The Spoils of War (1967)
 Sailing and Ships for You (1957)

Awards

 1959 – joint winner Children's Book of the Year Award: Older Readers for Sea Menace

See also
Arthur Piver

References

Australian non-fiction writers
1925 births
Possibly living people
English emigrants to Australia
People educated at Newington College
Graduates of the Royal Australian Naval College
Fleet Air Arm aviators